Dreamscape is a 1984 American dark science-fiction adventure film directed by Joseph Ruben and written by David Loughery, with Chuck Russell and Ruben co-writing. It stars Dennis Quaid, Kate Capshaw, Max von Sydow, and Christopher Plummer.

Plot
Alex Gardner (Dennis Quaid) is a psychic who has been using his talents solely for personal gain, which mainly consists of gambling and womanizing. When he was 19 years old, Alex had been the prime subject of a scientific research project documenting his psychic ability but, in the midst of the study, he disappeared. After running afoul of a local gangster/extortionist named Snead (Redmond Gleeson), Alex evades two of Snead's thugs by allowing himself to be taken by two men: Finch (Chris Mulkey) and Babcock (Peter Jason), who identify themselves as being from an academic institution.

At the institution, Alex is reunited with his former mentor Dr. Paul Novotny (Max von Sydow) who is now involved in government-funded psychic research. Novotny, aided by fellow scientist Dr. Jane DeVries (Kate Capshaw), has developed a technique that allows psychics to voluntarily link with the minds of others by projecting themselves into the subconscious during REM sleep. Novotny equates the original idea for the dreamscape project to the practice of the Senoi natives of Malaysia, who believe the dream world is just as real as reality.

The project was intended for clinical use to diagnose and treat sleep disorders, particularly nightmares, but it has been hijacked by Bob Blair (Christopher Plummer), a powerful government agent. Novotny convinces Alex to join the program in order to investigate Blair's intentions. Alex gains experience with the technique by helping a man who is worried about his wife's infidelity and by treating a young boy named Buddy (Cory Yothers), who is plagued with nightmares so terrible that a previous psychic lost his sanity trying to help him. Buddy's nightmare involves a large sinister "snake-man.”

A subplot involving Alex and Jane's growing infatuation culminates with him sneaking into Jane's dream to have sex with her. He does this without technological aid—something no one else has been able to achieve. With the help of novelist Charlie Prince (George Wendt), who has been covertly investigating the project for a new book, Alex learns that Blair intends to use the dream-linking technique for assassination.

Blair murders Prince and Novotny to silence them. The president of the United States (Eddie Albert) is admitted as a patient due to recurring nightmares. Blair assigns Tommy Ray Glatman (David Patrick Kelly), a mentally unstable psychic who murdered his own father, to enter the president's nightmare and assassinate him—people who die in their dreams also die in the real world. Blair considers the president's nightmares about nuclear holocaust as a sign of political weakness, which he deems a liability in the upcoming negotiations for nuclear disarmament.

Alex projects himself into the president's dream—a nightmare of a post nuclear war wasteland—to try to protect him. After a fight in which Tommy rips out a police officer's heart, Tommy attempts to incite a mutant-mob against the president, and he battles Alex in the form of the snake-man from Buddy's dream. Alex assumes the appearance of Tommy's murdered father (Eric Gold) in order to distract him, allowing the president to impale him with a spear. The president is grateful to Alex but reluctant to confront Blair, who wields considerable political power. To protect himself and Jane, Alex enters Blair's dream and kills him before Blair can retaliate.

The film ends with Jane and Alex boarding a train to Louisville, Kentucky, intent on making their previous dream encounter a reality. They are surprised to meet the ticket collector from Jane's dream, but they decide to ignore it and keep on.

Cast
 Dennis Quaid as Alex Gardner
 Max von Sydow as Dr. Paul Novotny
 Christopher Plummer as Bob Blair
 Kate Capshaw as Jane DeVries
 David Patrick Kelly as Tommy Ray Glatman
 George Wendt as Charlie Prince
 Eddie Albert as The President
 Chris Mulkey as Gary Finch
 Larry Gelman as Mr. Webber
 Cory Yothers as Buddy
 Redmond Gleeson as Snead
 Eric Gold as Tommy Ray's father
 Peter Jason as Roy Babcock
 Jana Taylor as Mrs. Webber

Production

According to author Roger Zelazny, the film developed from an initial outline that he wrote in 1981, based in part upon his novella "He Who Shapes" and 1966 novel The Dream Master. He was not involved in the project after 20th Century Fox bought his outline. Because he did not write the film treatment or the script, his name does not appear in the credits; assertions that he removed his name from the credits are unfounded. The music score is by French composer Maurice Jarre.

Principal photography began 3rd February 1983 in Los Angeles, CA. Locations included Union Station, Los Angeles, Los Alamitos Race Course, Los Alamitos, CA, and the University of the Pacific in Stockton, CA.

Release and reception

Dreamscape was released on August 15, 1984. The film was a box office success grossing 12.1 million dollars on a 6 million dollar budget.  This was the second film released to movie theaters that was rated PG-13 under then-new MPAA ratings guidelines, following Red Dawn, which had come out five days prior. The film was released on DVD on June 6, 2000, January 4, 2005, and April 7, 2015.

Dreamscape has a 79% 'Fresh' rating on review aggregator Rotten Tomatoes, based on 33 critics, with an average rating of 6.4/10. The critics consensus reads, "Dreamscape mixes several genres—horror, sci-fi, action—and always maintains a sense of adventure and humor." On Metacritic — which assigns a weighted mean score — the film has a score of 63 out of 100 based on 10 critics, indicating "generally favorable reviews".

See also
 List of American films of 1984

References

External links

 
 
 
 

1984 films
1984 horror films
1980s psychological thriller films
1980s science fiction horror films
20th Century Fox films
American satirical films
American science fiction horror films
American psychological thriller films
Films about nightmares
Films about sleep disorders
Films directed by Joseph Ruben
Films using stop-motion animation
Films scored by Maurice Jarre
Films with screenplays by David Loughery
Films based on science fiction novels
Films based on American novels
Adventure horror films
1980s English-language films
1980s American films